We Have Cause to Be Uneasy is the first and final full-length album by American indie rock band Wild Sweet Orange and was released on July 29, 2008, available on CD, Vinyl, and via iTunes.  "We Have Cause to Be Uneasy" is the title of the fifth chapter in C.S. Lewis' book, Mere Christianity.

Track listing
"Ten Dead Dogs" – 4:04
"Tilt" – 4:20
"Seeing and Believing" – 4:09
"Either/Or" – 4:17
"Sour Milk" – 5:55
"An Atlas to Follow" – 2:35
"House of Regret" – 5:10
"Crickets" – 5:11
"Aretha's Gold" – 6:50
"Night Terrors" – 3:34
"Land of No Return" – 4:21

Personnel

Garret Kelly – bass, piano
Chip Kilpatrick – drums, rhodes, accordion, vocals, programming, bells
Preston Lovinggood – vocals, acoustic guitar
Taylor Shaw – electric guitar, rhodes, vocals, toy piano
Tyler Burkum – guitar ("Tilt", "Either/Or", "Aretha's Gold")
Matt Pasons – guitar (on remainder of album, banjo on "An Atlas to Follow")
Kate Taylor – vocals ("Sour Milk", "House of Regret", "Night Terrors")
Rebekah Fox – vocals ("An Atlas to Follow", "Crickets")
Katie Crutchfield – vocals ("Seeing and Believing")

References

External links

2008 albums
Wild Sweet Orange albums